Nobody I Know is a song written by Paul McCartney (attributed to Lennon–McCartney) which Peter and Gordon recorded in an April 1964 session at Abbey Road Studio. Peter and Gordon had had a UK and US #1 hit with the McCartney composition "A World Without Love" and McCartney wrote "Nobody I Know" with the specific intent of providing a follow-up hit for the duo.  Billboard described the song as a "strong follow-up" to "A World Without Love."  Cash Box described it as "a captivating uptempo romancer...that the twosome wraps up with loads of charm."

Chart performance
"Nobody I Know" reached #10 UK and #12 US.

Cover versions
A French rendering entitled "Partir, il nous faut" was recorded by Petula Clark and issued on a 1965 EP headed by her hit "Dans les temps".

References

1964 singles
Songs written by Lennon–McCartney
Peter and Gordon songs
Columbia Graphophone Company singles
Capitol Records singles
1964 songs

Song recordings produced by John Burgess